1925 Emperor's Cup Final was the 5th final of the Emperor's Cup competition. The final was played at Meiji Jingu Gaien Stadium in Tokyo on November 2, 1925. Rijo Shukyu-Dan won the championship.

Overview
Defending champion Rijo Shukyu-Dan with Shizuo Miyama, Naoemon Shimizu and Sachi Kagawa on the team, won their 2nd title, by defeating Tokyo Imperial University with Shigemaru Takenokoshi on the team, 3–0. Rijo Shukyu-Dan won the title for 2 years in a row. Tokyo Imperial University was first Emperor's Cup finalist team as university team.

Match details

See also
1925 Emperor's Cup

References

Emperor's Cup
1925 in Japanese football